Uffington is a village and civil parish in the English county of Shropshire. The population of the civil parish at the 2011 census was 234.

Uffington is home to a church and a pub, the Corbet Arms. The Shrewsbury to Newport Canal once ran through the village. Within the parish lie the grade I listed ruins of Haughmond Abbey.

Highway engineer Sir Henry Maybury (1864-1943) was born in Uffington.

The 1997 Grand National winner, Lord Gyllene was trained by Steve Brookshaw in the village.

See also
 Haughmond Abbey
 Sundorne
 Battlefield, Shropshire
 Listed buildings in Uffington, Shropshire

References

Villages in Shropshire
Populated places on the River Severn